Brandon Carter,  (born 1942) is an Australian theoretical physicist, best known for his work on the properties of black holes and for being the first to name and employ the anthropic principle in its contemporary form. He is a researcher at the Meudon campus of the Laboratoire Univers et Théories, part of the CNRS.

Biography
Carter studied at the University of Cambridge under Dennis Sciama.  He found the exact solution of the geodesic equations for the Kerr/Newman electrovacuum solution, and the maximal analytic extension of this solution. In the process, he discovered the extraordinary fourth constant of motion and the Killing–Yano tensor. Together with Werner Israel and Stephen Hawking, he proved partially the no-hair theorem in general relativity, stating that all stationary black holes are completely characterized by mass, charge, and angular momentum. In 1982 with astrophysicist Jean-Pierre Luminet, he invented the concept of tidal disruption event (TDE), namely the destruction of a star passing in the vicinity of a supermassive black hole. They showed that this phenomenon could result in the violent destruction of the star in the form of a  "stellar pancake", causing a reactivation of nuclear reactions in the core of the star in the stage of its maximum compression. More recently, Carter, Chachoua, and Chamel (2005) have formulated a relativistic theory of elastic deformations in neutron stars.

References
 
 
 
 
 Carter, B. & Luminet, J.- P. (1982) "Pancake Detonation of Stars by Black Holes in Galactic Nuclei". Nature 296, 211 (1982)

External links
 Site of the Laboratoire Univers et Théories (LUTH)
 Brandon Carter’s page at the LUTH (in French)

1942 births
20th-century Australian physicists
21st-century Australian physicists
French National Centre for Scientific Research scientists
Fellows of the Royal Society
Living people